Durham Region Transit (DRT) is the regional public transit operator in Durham Region, Ontario, Canada, east of Toronto. Its headquarters are at 605 Rossland Rd East in Whitby, Ontario, and there are regional centres in Ajax, Whitby, and Oshawa.  It was formed by the merger of Ajax/Pickering Transit, Whitby Transit, Oshawa Transit, and Clarington Transit.

Overview
DRT's operation is overseen by the Durham Region Transit Commission, consisting of the members of Durham Region Council. In April 2007, a new Durham Region Transit Executive Committee was created to take over day-to-day oversight responsibilities, with the full Commission meeting on a limited basis as needed. The Executive Committee consists of the Regional Chair and one councilor from each of the eight Durham Region municipalities as appointed by the Mayor of each municipality.

DRT is organized into operating divisions mirroring its predecessor systems:

 Raleigh (originally known as DRT East) serving the City of Oshawa and the Municipality of Clarington
 Victoria (originally known as DRT Centre) serving the Town of Whitby
 Westney (originally known as DRT West) serving the Town of Ajax and the City of Pickering
 North (originally known as DRT North) serving the Townships of Brock, Scugog, and Uxbridge
 DRT Specialized Services providing service for the disabled

Most of DRT's operational and maintenance services are provided by regional staff who are members of Canadian Auto Workers Local 222.

Whitby initially operated under the terms of an existing Whitby Transit contract with Trentway-Wagar. A new contract that combined Brock, Scugog & Uxbridge operations with Whitby operations was awarded to Trentway-Wagar in 2011. The drivers and maintenance staff were therefore employees of Trentway-Wagar. This contract ended on June 30, 2016.

Routes

On July 28, 2008, DRT introduced a unified route number system using a three digit format, with the first digit indicating the municipality:

 100: Pickering
200: Ajax
300: Whitby/Brooklin
 400: Oshawa/Courtice
 500: Clarington
 600: Uxbridge, Scugog, and Brock townships
900: Regional/Cross-boundary

Service changes
In its first year of operation in 2006, DRT implemented a number of service changes:
 A common fare across Durham Region including transfer privileges
 Access to GO Transit bus services operating within Durham Region for a standard DRT fare or transfer
 Service for the northern communities of Port Perry, Brock, and Uxbridge in the form of community buses operating on specific days of the week
 Implementation of Fixed-route evening/Sunday service in Ajax and Pickering replacing the former "dial-a-bus" service.
 Service level improvements on several routes
 The introduction of several new or extended routes, including:
 Rush-hour Service along Brock Street/Baldwin Street (Highway 12) to Brooklin
 Rush-hour Service along Bloor Street and Victoria Street (Durham Regional Road 22) from Oshawa GO to Whitby GO Train Stations
 Service on Audley Road in Ajax, both south of Bayly Street and north of Kingston Road
 Service along Townline Road in eastern Oshawa and Courtice
 Weekend service to Whitby and Oshawa GO Transit stations

In 2007, the following new services were introduced:
 915 Taunton: grid service from Pickering GO Station via Bayly, Westney, Taunton and Simcoe to Durham College/UOIT
 916 Rossland : grid service from Ajax GO Station via Westney, Bayly, Harwood, Rossland, Grandview, Taunton, Ritson, Conlin and Simcoe
 302 Brock/Brooklin: increased service to Brooklin
 20 Westney and 40 Applecroft, and elimination of 23 Nottingham as a separate route
 504 Orono/Newcastle: revised to include Newcastle
 950 Uxbridge/Port Perry/UOIT: a grid weekday route from Uxbridge and Port Perry to Durham College/UOIT
 replacement of Whitby dial a ride and shuttle bus service from the GO station with fixed routes

As a consequence of an operational budget shortfall, DRT implemented service cutbacks in December 2007 and March 2008, including cancellation of midday services, reduction in service hours and frequencies, and elimination of its 10 Ajax route.

DRT Pulse

DRT Pulse is the brand name for bus rapid transit service operating in Durham Region and the Scarborough district of Toronto. There are two DRT Pulse routes:
 900 runs east–west along Highway 2 in Durham Region and along Ellesmere Avenue in Scarborough between Downtown Oshawa and the University of Toronto Scarborough campus. Connections to Toronto Transit Commission services are available at U of T Scarborough and connections to GO Transit are available at various points along the line. The route partially operates in dedicated bus lanes. 
 901 runs north–south along Simcoe Street between Lake Ontario to  Windfield Farms via the OTU/Durham College North Campus. The route operates in mixed traffic.

Route 900, the first phase of DRT Pulse, began service June 29, 2013, operating along the Highway 2 corridor between Downtown Oshawa and the University of Toronto Scarborough campus. The new service used 26 Xcelsior buses built by New Flyer Industries; the buses were painted in the orange and green DRT Pulse colours. Operating seven days per week, route 900 partly replaced GO Transit buses in the area. The buses made limited stops, but initially operated entirely in mixed traffic. DRT Pulse was complemented by improved DRT and GO Transit service along Taunton Road, Rossland Road, and Bayly/Bloor/Victoria Streets.

By 2015, Durham Region had installed reserved lanes on Kingston Road (Highway 2) in Ajax for DRT Pulse and GO Transit buses. These cube-side lanes were delimited by painted markings on the road surface and diamond signs over the lanes.

In September 2020, articulated buses, branded for DRT Pulse, were introduced on route 900.

On September 28, 2020, DRT Pulse service started along Simcoe Street as route 901.

Metrolinx plans to build the Durham–Scarborough BRT that would place most of route 900 in dedicated lanes, with the majority of the route being in the centre median strip of the roadway. Additional lanes will be added in certain sections to accommodate traffic levels, while some areas will see reduced traffic lanes or a complete closure to traffic.

Whitby Autonomous Vehicle Electric shuttle
WAVE began service on November 8, 2021 using small, automated, driverless, electric vehicles. WAVE operated over a  circuit beginning and ending at Whitby GO Station and travelling through the Port Whitby neighbourhood in south Whitby. For safety reasons, an attendant was on board the vehicle during the pilot phase of the project. The service operated as Durham Region Transit route 300 between 8:30 am and 3:30 pm on weekdays and between 7 am and 7 pm on weekends. The project partners included Metrolinx, Durham Region Transit and the City of Whitby.

The service was suspended after an accident on December 16, 2021 that injured the attendant riding on the autonomous vehicle. At the time of the accident, the attendant was operating the vehicle in manual mode which suppressed the safety features of autonomous mode. The Ontario Ministry of Transport suspended the operating licence for the service after the accident. The service was cancelled after Local Motors, the vehicle supplier, went out of business on January 14, 2022.

Fares
DRT fares can be paid by cash or Presto cards.  For customers paying a single ride fare by cash or Presto, the transfer is valid for unlimited travel on any DRT bus route in any direction for up to 2 hours from the time of issue.  A monthly DRT bus pass provides unlimited travel across the entire DRT bus network for the entire month selected.  Children ages 0 to 12 can travel fare free on DRT (similar to the program already in place on neighboring GO Transit and Toronto Transit Commission (TTC) services).

Facilities
DRT uses the following maintenance and operational facilities:

Raleigh Division:
Address: 710 Raleigh Avenue, Oshawa
Coordinates: 
Opened: 1965 (original) 1980 (GO Transit expansion)
Facilities: bus storage, maintenance and servicing for DRT (GO Transit no longer operates out of this location 2012-13)

Whitby Works Satellite Division - Trentway-Wagar / Coach Canada:
Address: 1559 Victoria Street East, Whitby
Coordinates: 
Facilities: bus storage, maintenance and repairs

Westney Division:
Address: 110 Westney Road South, Ajax
Coordinates: 
Opened: 1988
Facilities: bus storage, maintenance and repairs

Pickering Works Satellite Division (Discontinued Late Aug 2014)
Address: 2570 Tillings Road, Pickering
Coordinates: 
Facilities: Previously used for bus storage only. DRT discontinued their use of space at this location Late August 2014; buses were transferred to Westney and/or Raleigh divisions to compensate. Now City of Pickering Operations Centre.

History
DRT was formed in January 2006 through an amalgamation of existing municipal transit systems in Pickering, Ajax, Whitby, Oshawa, and Clarington (Bowmanville). The systems were transferred to the regional government along with the legal authority to operate public transit in the local municipalities.  This required approval by both Durham Region Council as well as four out of eight local municipal councils consisting of at least 50% of the population of the Region. The approval process took several years, with final approval for the amalgamation given by Durham Region Council on February 9, 2005. The remainder of 2005 was spent preparing for the merger. DRT assumed its responsibilities and inherited the equipment and facilities of its predecessor systems effective January 1, 2006.

On October 5, 2006, members of Local 222 began a legal strike action against DRT. All services were suspended other than those operated by Trentway-Wagar in Whitby. Limited specialized service continued via the use of contracted taxis. On October 29, a tentative settlement was announced, and full service resumed on November 3.

Previous systems
Public transit service in Durham Region has a long history prior to the creation of DRT, dating back to the 19th century.  The list below shows predecessor transit systems in each municipality:

Pickering
 Pickering Transit 1970s-2001
 Ajax Pickering Transit Authority 2001-2005
Ajax
 Charterways Transportation Limited 1969-1973
 Ajax Transit 1973-2001
 Ajax Pickering Transit Authority 2001-2005
Whitby
 Burley Bus Lines 1960-1970
 Charterways Transportation Limited 8 week trial in 1976
 Whitby Transit 1980-2005
 Specialized Service provided by Handi-Transit 1974-2005
Oshawa
 Oshawa Railway Company (operated by Canadian National Railway) 1895-1959
 Queen Bus Lines 1920s
 Oshawa Transit 1960-2005
 Specialized Service provided by Handi-Transit 1974-2005
Clarington
 Clarington Transit 2002-2005
 Specialized Service provided by Handi-Transit 1974-2005

See also
 Toronto Transit Commission
 GO Transit

References 

 Regional Transit Business Case 
 Durham Region's Transit Improvement Plan

External links

 Durham Region Transit
  published November 11, 2021

Transit agencies in Ontario
Canadian companies established in 2006
Companies based in Ontario
Ajax, Ontario
Transport companies established in 2006
2006 establishments in Ontario